The Minzu Hotel (literally "Nationalities Hotel") is located on West Chang'an Avenue, in Xicheng District, Beijing, China. Having its opening in 1959, it was one of the Ten Great Buildings of Beijing in 1950s, and has hosted numerous foreign delegations. It is also a common place for press conferences. The 10-storey 4 star hotel has 507 rooms.

See also
 List of hotels in Beijing

References

External links

 Minzu Hotel

Hotel buildings completed in 1959
Hotels established in 1959
Hotels in Beijing
Xicheng District